Bobby D. Crim (born December 10, 1931) is a former Democratic politician from Michigan who served in the Michigan House of Representatives, and who served as Speaker of the House from 1973 through 1982.

Crim is the founder of the Crim Festival of Races, an annual road race event in his hometown of Flint, Michigan. He is also a co-founder of a lobbying firm, Governmental Consultant Services, Inc., along with former Senate Majority Leader Robert VanderLaan. Crim is also a trustee emeritus of Michigan State University, having served on the board in 1983 and 1984.

Life
In 1968, Bobby Crim served as a presidential elector.

Crim, then speaker of the state house, started the Crim in Flint as a 10-mile race in 1977.

In 2007, Crim appeared on Michigan Public Television's "Off the Record" program and expressed his opposition to term-limit provisions in Michigan's Constitution.

On August 21, 2014, a bronze statue of Crim was dedicated in downtown Flint near the starting line of the Crim Festival of Races.

References 

1931 births
Living people
Speakers of the Michigan House of Representatives
Democratic Party members of the Michigan House of Representatives
People from Kennett, Missouri
Politicians from Flint, Michigan
Michigan State University people
University of Michigan–Flint alumni
1968 United States presidential electors
20th-century American politicians